"Just the Way You Are" is a song by Billy Joel from his fifth studio album The Stranger (1977). It was released in September 1977 as the album's lead single. It became both Joel's first US Top 10 and UK Top 20 single (reaching No. 3 and No. 19 respectively), as well as Joel's first gold single in the US.  The song also topped the Billboard Easy Listening Chart for the entire month of January 1978.

"Just the Way You Are" garnered two Grammy Awards for Record of the Year and Song of the Year in 1979.

Background
Joel shared that the melody and chord progression for this song came to him while he was dreaming. In an interview on the Howard Stern Radio Show on November 16, 2010, Joel revealed that the inspiration for writing the name of the song and how it sounds in the chorus was directly taken from the last line in the Frankie Valli and the Four Seasons song "Rag Doll", which incidentally was also a larger inspiration for Joel's later song "Uptown Girl". The song, which Joel had written for his first wife (and also his business manager at the time) Elizabeth Weber, was not liked by either Joel or his band, and Joel had originally decided against making the track a part of The Stranger, but at the request of both Linda Ronstadt and Phoebe Snow (both were recording in other studios in the same building at the time), he agreed to put the song on the final mix. However, the album's producer, Phil Ramone, later contradicted Joel's claim, stating in an interview that they could not afford to exclude the song because Joel did not have that much material from which to choose for the album. The song also shares some similarities to "I'm Not in Love" by 10cc, due to the keyboard and background vocal tape loops Joel and Ramone used.

After Joel and Weber divorced in 1982, Joel rarely performed the song live after 1986 until the 2000s, and Joel has publicly stated that he disliked playing the song live in the wake of his divorce from his first wife. He noted that during performances of the song around the time of his first divorce, his drummer Liberty DeVitto would jokingly parody the lyrics in the chorus as "She got the house. She got the car."

When "Just the Way You Are" was released as a single, it was shortened by over a minute. The differences are the removal of the second verse and an earlier fade. A live performance of the song was also used as a music video. On February 18, 1978, the song peaked at No. 3, and Joel performed a shorter version of the song as the musical guest that day on Saturday Night Live (along with "Only the Good Die Young"). The single version (fading 8 seconds later) was included in the first release of Greatest Hits Volume I & Volume II, but the full album version was restored for the remastered release of that compilation.

The saxophone solo was played by Phil Woods, a well-known jazz performer and Grammy award winner. Woods' performance here exposed him to a wider audience and introduced his music to rock fans.

Reception
Cash Box said that "a slight influence of Stevie Wonder is evident in the melody and light Latin rhythm." Record World called it "a thoughtful ballad, very well produced, with a sax break that excels."

Track listing
7" U.S. and UK single (1977)
 "Just the Way You Are" – 3:27
 "Get It Right the First Time" – 3:54

Personnel
 Billy Joel – lead vocals, Fender Rhodes
 Hugh McCracken – acoustic guitar
 Steve Burgh – acoustic guitar
 Doug Stegmeyer – bass guitar
 Liberty DeVitto – drums
 Ralph MacDonald – percussion 
 Phil Woods – alto saxophone 
 Patrick Williams – orchestration

Production
 Phil Ramone – producer, engineer
 Jim Boyer – engineer

Charts

Weekly charts

Barry White cover

Year-end charts

Certifications

See also
 List of number-one adult contemporary singles of 1978 (U.S.)

References

External links
  (Billy Joel)
  (Barry White)

1970s ballads
1977 singles
1978 singles
Billy Joel songs
Barry White songs
Songs written by Billy Joel
Grammy Hall of Fame Award recipients
Grammy Award for Record of the Year
Grammy Award for Song of the Year
Song recordings produced by Phil Ramone
Columbia Records singles
1977 songs